Mount Copaja or Capaja (Cerro Capaja) is a mountain in the Western Andes, located in the province of Oruro, Bolivia (c. 18°09'S, 68°22'W).

References 
List of peaks in the Andes
GEONet Name Server database
List of mountains of Bolivia

Copaja